Posh Alexander (born March 31, 2001) is an American college basketball player for the St. John's Red Storm of the Big East Conference.

High school career
Alexander attended Our Saviour Lutheran School in The Bronx, New York. He missed most of his junior season with a broken left arm. Alexander posted a league-record 60 points, eight assists and seven rebounds against Word of God Christian Academy. As a senior, he led his team to the Grind Session title game. Alexander competed for the New York Lightning on the Amateur Athletic Union circuit. He committed to playing college basketball for St. John's over offers from Dayton, Illinois, Pittsburgh and Seton Hall.

College career
On February 3, 2021, Alexander recorded 16 points, six assists, four rebounds and three steals in a 70–59 upset win over third-ranked Villanova. In his next game, on February 6, he posted a freshman season-high 21 points and six assists in a 92–81 victory over Providence. Three days later, he earned USBWA National Freshman of the Week honors. At the end of the regular season, Alexander was named Big East Co-Defensive Player of the Year and Big East Freshman of the Year. He became the fourth player to win both awards, joining Allen Iverson, Alonzo Mourning and Patrick Ewing. He was a unanimous Big East All-Freshman Team selection. As a freshman, Alexander averaged 10.9 points, 4.3 assists, 3.4 rebounds and 2.6 steals per game. He led the Big East and all freshmen nationally in steals per game. Alexander was named Honorable Mention All-Big East as a sophomore.

Career statistics

College

|-
| style="text-align:left;"| 2020–21
| style="text-align:left;"| St. John's
| 25 || 24 || 31.0 || .454 || .299 || .725 || 3.4 || 4.3 || 2.6 || .0 || 10.9
|-
| style="text-align:left;"| 2021–22
| style="text-align:left;"| St. John's
| 29 || 25 || 31.9 || .498 || .217 || .741 || 4.4 || 5.5 || 2.3 || .2 || 13.8
|-
| style="text-align:left;"| 2022–23
| style="text-align:left;"| St. John's
| 30 || 28 || 32.8 || .400 || .232 || .724 || 3.9 || 4.2 || 2.0 || .1 || 10.2
|- class="sortbottom"
| style="text-align:center;" colspan="2"| Career
| 84 || 77 || 32.0 || .452 || .250 || .732 || 4.0 || 4.7 || 2.3 || .1 || 11.7

References

External links
St. John's Red Storm bio

2001 births
Living people
American men's basketball players
Basketball players from New York City
Point guards
Sportspeople from Brooklyn
St. John's Red Storm men's basketball players